Amina Ally Bilali is a Tanzanian professional footballer who plays as a midfielder for Yanga Princess and the Tanzania women's national team.

International career 
Ally captained the Tanzania women's national team at the 2020 COSAFA Women's Championship and the 2021 COSAFA Women's Championship.

She was adjudged the man of the match of the final against Malawi which they won by 1–0 via a goal from Enekia Kasonga and later the player of the tournament.

Honours 

 CECAFA Women's Championship: 2018
 COSAFA Women's Championship: 2021
 COSAFA Women's Championship Player of the tournament: 2021

References

External links 

 

Living people
Tanzanian women's footballers
Women's association football midfielders
Tanzania women's international footballers
Year of birth missing (living people)